The canton of Longuenesse is an administrative division of the Pas-de-Calais department, in northern France. It was created at the French canton reorganisation which came into effect in March 2015. Its seat is in Longuenesse.

It consists of the following communes: 
Arques 
Blendecques
Campagne-lès-Wardrecques
Hallines
Helfaut
Longuenesse
Wizernes

References

Cantons of Pas-de-Calais